Gasteracantha sturi, commonly known as the blunt-spined kite spider, is a species of spider belonging to the family Araneidae. It is found in Southeast Asia, from Laos to the Moluccas.

The abdomen is much broader than long and bright yellow with two black cross lines. The lateral corners have thick, blunt spikes with two shorter, sharper spikes both on the front and rear margins. All the spikes are black.

References

sturi
Fauna of Southeast Asia
Spiders of Asia
Spiders described in 1857